The discography of American rock band Mr. Big consists of nine studio albums, ten live albums, four compilation albums, and sixteen singles.

Albums

Studio albums

Live albums
{| class="wikitable" style="text-align:center;"
|-
! rowspan="2"| Year
! rowspan="2"| Album details
! colspan="1"| Peak chart positions
! rowspan="2"| Certifications
|- style="font-size:smaller;"
! style="width:50px;"| JPN
|-
| 1990
| style="text-align:left;"| Raw Like Sushi
| 32
|
|-
| rowspan="2"| 1992
| style="text-align:left;"| Mr. Big Live (Live in San Francisco)| 45
|
|-
| style="text-align:left;"| Raw Like Sushi II| 8
|
 RIAJ: Gold
|-
| 1994
| style="text-align:left;"| Japandemonium: Raw Like Sushi 3| 11
|
 RIAJ: Gold
|-
| 1996
| style="text-align:left;"| Channel V at the Hard Rock Live| 32
|
|-
| 1997
| style="text-align:left;"| Live at Budokan| 20
|
|-
| 1999
| style="text-align:left;"| Static| —
|
|-
| 2002
| style="text-align:left;"| In Japan| 12
|
|-
| 2009
| style="text-align:left;"| Back to Budokan| 50
|
|-
| rowspan="2"| 2012
| style="text-align:left;"| Live from the Living Room| —
|
|-
| style="text-align:left;"| Raw Like Sushi 100: Live in Japan 100th Anniversary| —
|
|-
| rowspan="2"| 2015
| style="text-align:left;"| Raw Like Sushi 114| —
|
|-
| style="text-align:left;"| R.L.S. 113 Sendai| —
|
|-
| 2018
| style="text-align:left;"| Live from Milan| —
|
|-
| colspan="6" style="text-align:center; font-size:9pt;"| "—" denotes releases that did not chart or were not released in that territory.
|}

Compilation albums

Singles

VideosLive and Kickin (1992)Live (Live in San Francisco) (1992)A Group Portrait (1993)Lean Into It (1993)Big, Bigger, Biggest! The Best of Mr. Big (Greatest Video Hits) (1997)Farewell Live in Japan (2002)Back to Budokan (2009)Raw Like Sushi 114'' (2015)

References

Discographies of American artists
Heavy metal group discographies
Rock music group discographies